RSTA was a football club from Bhutan, based at Changlimithang, who played in the Bhutan A-Division, then the top level of football in Bhutan, but since replaced by a full national league.

History
It is known that RSTA participated in the 2002, although their final position is not known. The only known result involving RSTA is a 5–0 loss to Druk Pol.

References

Football clubs in Bhutan
Sport in Thimphu